Route 267 is a short state highway in the St. Louis, Missouri area. Its northern terminus is at Broadway in south St. Louis; its southern terminus is at an intersection with U.S. Route 50 (US 50), US 61, and US 67, locally known as Lindbergh Boulevard (to the east and west) and Lemay Ferry Road to the south. The route is locally known as Lemay Ferry Road.

Route description
Route 267 begins at an intersection with US 50/US 61/US 67 in Mehlville, St. Louis County, heading northeast on four-lane divided Lemay Ferry Road. The road continues past this intersection as part of US 61/US 67. From the southern terminus, the route heads through business areas, becoming a five-lane road with a center left-turn lane. Route 267 loses the center turn lane and continues through suburban areas of homes and commercial establishments. The road gains a median as it heads into more urban areas of residences and businesses before narrowing into a two-lane undivided road. Farther northeast, the route terminates at an intersection with River City Casino Boulevard, just inside the St. Louis city limits. Straight ahead lies Alabama Avenue, which crosses over the River des Peres to continue north into the city.

History

Route 267 formerly continued north along Alabama Avenue across River des Peres further into St. Louis. A short distance later, Route 267 turned southeast onto four-lane divided Marceau Street and passes through residential areas, eventually terminating at an intersection with Broadway. This segment of the route was eliminated between 2012 and 2015.

Major intersections

References

External links

267
Transportation in St. Louis County, Missouri
Streets in St. Louis